Election is a 2013 Indian Kannada-language action drama film directed by Om Prakash Rao and produced by Ramu under the banner Ramu Enterprises. The film stars Malashri in the lead role. The supporting cast features Pradeep Rawat, Dev Gill, Sharath Lohitashwa, Hanumanthegowda and Suchendra Prasad.
The film was later dubbed in Hindi as
Sher E Jigar in 2018 on WAM.

Cast 
 Malashri as Indira
 Pradeep Rawat as Narasimha
 Dev Gill as Deviprasad
 Srinivasa Murthy
 Lohitashwa as Vishwanath
 Hanumanthegowda as Gangadhara
 Suchendra Prasad as Ramaswamy
 Sadhu Kokila
 Bullet Prakash
 Ganesh Rao Kesarkar 
 Shobhraj 
 Mallesh Gowda 
 Mahesh Dev 
 G. K. Govinda Rao 
 Param Gubbi 
 Meghana Naidu as an item number

Production

Filming 
The filming of Election began on 8 December 2012 in Bangalore.

Pre-release revenues 

Soundtrack

Reception 
Election received mixed to negative response from critics upon its theatrical release. G. S. Kumar of The Times of India gave the film a rating of three out of five and wrote, "Director N Omprakash Rao has done a good job of a story that helps you understand the lifestyle of politicians, how they indulge in goondaism, sex and luring voters with gifts, including money." and praised the role of acting and cinematography in the film.

References 

2013 films
2010s Kannada-language films
Films scored by Hamsalekha
Films directed by Om Prakash Rao